Nikolai Sergeevich Borchsenius (20 October 1906 Saint Petersburg - 5 May 1965, Leningrad) was a Russian entomologist who specialised in the Coccoidea.

Selected publications
1949 Identification of the soft and armored scales of Armenia. (In Russian.) Proceedings of the Armenian SSR Academy of Sciences 1949: 1-271.
1950. Mealybugs and scale insects of the USSR (Coccoidea). (In Russian.) Zoological Institute, USSR Academy of Sciences, Moscow, Russia. 250 pp.
1965. Essay on the classification of the armoured scale insects (Homoptera, Coccoidea, Diaspididae). (In Russian.) Энтомологическое обозрение (Entomological Review) 44: 208-214.

Collection
Borchsenius' collection is in the Quarantine-Laboratorium of the Zoological Institute of the Russian Academy of Sciences in Saint Petersburg.

References
Kryžanovskij, O. L. 1965: [In memoriam N.S. Borkhsenius (1906-1965)]  Entomological Review. 44(4) 951-957, Portrait
Rao, V. P. 1966: [Borchsenius, N. S.] Indian Journal of Entomology 28 155, Portrait

1906 births
1965 deaths
Soviet entomologists